The 2012 Men's European Individual Closed Championships is the men's edition of the 2012 European Squash Individual Championships, which serves as the individual European championship for squash players. The event took place in Helsinki in Finland from 23 to 26 May 2012. Olli Tuominen won his first European Individual Championships title, defeating Borja Golán in the final.

Seeds

Draw and results

Finals

See also
2012 Women's European Individual Closed Championships
European Squash Individual Championships

References

External links
European Squash Championships 2012 official website

2012 in squash
Squash in Europe
Squash tournaments in Finland
2013 in Finnish sport
International sports competitions hosted by Finland